The Academy of Art Urban Knights are the 14 varsity athletic teams that represent Academy of Art University, located in San Francisco, California, in NCAA Division II intercollegiate sports. The Urban Knights compete as members of the Pacific West Conference.

History
The university's athletic department was established in 2006 with the hiring of Jamie Williams as Athletic Director. In July 2009, Academy of Art began the three-year transition process to become a member of the NCAA. At that time, they joined the Pacific West Conference in Division II. This process was completed successfully with the Urban Knights being granted full membership privileges by the NCAA in July 2012.

The men's basketball team earned their first victory against a Division I team on November 28, 2021 when they beat the UC Davis Aggies 79–60.

Notable people
A number of Academy of Art's athletes and staff have participated in professional sports and in the Olympic Games. They include:
 Brandon Poulson – played 2 seasons after being signed by the Minnesota Twins in 2010
 Mobolade Ajomale – 2016 Olympic bronze medalist in the 4 × 100 m relay
 Lindsey Yamasaki – school's first women's basketball coach played 2 seasons in the WNBA 
 Jamie Williams – school's first athletic director played 12 seasons as a tight end in the NFL

Varsity sports

Men's sports 
 Baseball
 Basketball
 Cross Country
 Golf
 Soccer
 Track & Field

Women's sports 
 Basketball
 Cross Country
 Golf
 Soccer
 Softball
 Tennis
 Track & Field
 Volleyball

National championships

References

External links